Gregg Binkley (born March 20, 1963) is an American television actor. He is known for playing Kenny James on My Name is Earl (2005-2009), Barney on Raising Hope (2010-2014), and Harold in Revenge of the Nerds III: The Next Generation (1992).

Early life and career
Binkley grew up in Topeka, Kansas, and graduated from Washburn Rural High School where he served as the class president of 1981. Upon moving to California, he was a contestant on Classic Concentration in May 1988.

He is best known for his roles as Kenny James on the NBC sitcom My Name Is Earl and as Dan, the Del Taco spokesperson. He has also had guest spots on Gilmore Girls, Malcolm in the Middle, Sabrina, the Teenage Witch, Yes, Dear, The Drew Carey Show, Full House, Family Matters and Wizards of Waverly Place.

Binkley once held a job making celebrity impersonation phone calls, posing as Don Knotts' character Barney Fife. Binkley also did this impersonation in Behind the Camera: The Unauthorized Story of Three's Company.

Filmography

Film

Television

Personal life
He met his wife, Tokiko Ohniwa, in an acting class. They were married on May 31, 2003, and have three children.

References

External links

1963 births
Living people
American male television actors
Male actors from Kansas
Actors from Topeka, Kansas